Jonas Chernick (born July 16, 1973) is a Canadian actor and screenwriter.

Career 
Chernick's credits as an actor include the films Inertia, Lucid, Paid in Full, Seven Times Lucky, Mayday, Blood Pressure, My Awkward Sexual Adventure, How to Plan an Orgy in a Small Town, Borealis, The Go-Getters, James vs. His Future Self, Cinema of Sleep, The Last Mark and Ashgrove, and the television series The Border, At the Hotel, Living in Your Car, Degrassi, The Eleventh Hour and The Best Laid Plans. He was credited as a writer on Lucid, My Awkward Sexual Adventure, Borealis and James vs. His Future Self.

He won the Gemini Award for Best Supporting Actor in a Drama Program or Series at the 23rd Gemini Awards in 2008, for his role as Agent Slade in The Border.

Personal life 
Originally from Winnipeg, Manitoba, Chernick was born and raised in a prominent local Jewish family. He is based in Toronto, Ontario.

Filmography

Film

Television

References

External links

1973 births
Canadian male film actors
Canadian male television actors
Male actors from Winnipeg
21st-century Canadian screenwriters
Jewish Canadian male actors
Jewish Canadian writers
Writers from Winnipeg
Living people
Best Supporting Actor in a Drama Series Canadian Screen Award winners
21st-century Canadian male actors
Canadian male screenwriters